The Lumen Prize is an international award which celebrates art created with technology, especially digital art.

Overview
The prize was founded by Carla Rapoport in 2012, The Lumen Prize has visited more than ten cities around the world including Amsterdam, Athens, Hong Kong, New York, Riga, Swansea and Shanghai.

Through its parent company Lumen Art Projects, which promotes the work of longlisted, shortlisted and winning artists, Lumen has collaborated with the Barbican Centre, Computer Arts Society and the EVA London Conferences as well as the Tate, Photomonitor, Goldsmiths, University of London, Eureka! (Halifax), the British Computer Society, IBM UK, the Royal College of Art (London), CYLAND Media Lab (Saint Petersburg), etc.

Since its launch, the Lumen Prize has given away more than $80,000 in prize money and staged over 45 exhibitions globally.

Prize winners
Past Lumen Prize Gold Award winners include artists Refik Anadol, Andy Lomas, Gibson/Martelli and Mario Klingemann. The 2019 shortlist was profiled by SeditionArt.

2020 winners
 Lumen Prize Gold Award: La Victoria by Julieta Gil
 Moving Image Award: Compressed Cinema by Casey Reas
 Still Image Award: Terram in Aspectu by Liliana Farber
 3D Interactive Award: Hertzian Landscapes by Richard Vijgen
 XR Award:(Un)Balanced by Elyne Legarnisson
 Global South Award: Cosmos Within Us by Tupac Martir
 Nordic Award: Deux Mille by Søren Krag
 BCS AI Award: Helin by Christian Mio Loclair
 Photomonitor Student Prize: Racing Thoughts by Liu Wa

2019 winners

 Lumen Prize Gold Award: Melting Memories by Refik Anadol
 Moving Image Award: Love Birds, Night Birds, Devil Birds by Cassie McQuater
 Still Image Award: Drawing Operations by Sougwen Chung
 BCS AI Award: Lichtsuchende by Dave Murray-Rust and Rocio von Jungenfeld
 3D/Interactive Award: We Are All Made of Light by Maja Pétric
 XR Award: Trail of Angels by Kristina Buozyte & Vitalijus Zukas
 People’s Choice Award: Phygital Palimpest by Stefan Gant
 Photomonitor Student Award: A Capricious Pathway by Cassie Suche
 Rapoport Award for Women in Art and Tech: Resurrecting the Sublime, 2019 by Alexandra Daisy Ginsberg, Dr. Christina Agapakis/Gingo Bioworks, and Sissel Tolaas

2018 winners
 
 Lumen Prize Gold Award: The Butcher’s Son by Mario Klingemann (Germany)
 Moving Image Award: Avyakrta: The Unanswered Questions by Sungjae Lee (South Korea)
 3D/Interactive Award: Fidgety (In between up and down) by GayBird (Hong Kong)
 AR/VR Award: Tree by New Reality Company (UK)
 Still Image Award: Overload (Consequence) by Mark Lyons (UK)
 Rapoport Award for Women in Digital Art: In Defence of Industry by Felicity Hammond (UK)
 People’s Choice Award: Aerobanquets RMX by Mattia Caselegno (Italy, based in USA) with Flavio Gignoni Cartestia (food art), Mattheu Cherubini (coding), Martux_M (audio), Fito Segrera (tech assistance)
 BCS Artificial Intelligence Award: Degenerative Cultures Cesar & Lois An artwork by Cesar Baio and The League of Imaginary Scientists (Lois). Contributors: Scott Morgans (biologist)
 Meural Student Prize: The Punishment of Tantalus by Ziwei Wu (China)

References

External links
 Official website

Awards established in 2012
Contemporary art awards
Digital art
International art awards